Edge School is a private school located in the Rocky View County, just west of Calgary, Alberta, Canada. Edge School offers training in dance, golf, hockey, soccer, figure skating, basketball, and a flex program for students who would like to pursue a sport other than those currently offered.  Edge follows a  three-sphere philosophy – academics, athletics and character development of students - which aims to prepare students for either post secondary education or a career in their chosen sport.

History
The school was founded in 1999 by Brent Devost, and combines athletics with a strong emphasis on academics. 

In 2008, Edge built a new 170,000 square foot facility with complete academic amenities and a state-of-the-art sports complex.

Jim Davidson Sports Complex
The Jim Davidson Sports Complex is a world-class athletic, recreational and community-use facility. Inside the 90,000 sq. ft. complex there are 2 NHL-sized arenas, Founders & Alumni Lounge, gymnasium with 2 NBA-sized courts, high-performance training centre, 3 professional dance studios, golf centre, and a sports medicine clinic.

Alumni 
Thomas Hickey (New York Islanders)
Joe Colborne (Colorado Avalanche)
Tyler Myers (Vancouver Canucks)
Matt Dumba (Minnesota Wild)
Jake Bean (Carolina Hurricanes)
Jaret Anderson-Dolan (Los Angeles Kings)
Jacob Bernard-Docker (Ottawa Senators)
Taro Hirose (Detroit Red Wings)

References

External links
 Edge School web page

High schools in Calgary